Xenorhina ophiodon is a species of frog in the family Microhylidae.
It is endemic to West Papua, Indonesia.
Its natural habitat is subtropical or tropical moist montane forests.
It is threatened by habitat loss.

References

Xenorhina
Amphibians of Western New Guinea
Taxonomy articles created by Polbot
Amphibians described in 1878
Taxa named by Wilhelm Peters